Evidence is a 1922 American silent drama film directed by George Archainbaud and starring Elaine Hammerstein, Niles Welch and Holmes Herbert.

Cast
 Elaine Hammerstein as Florette
 Niles Welch as Phillip Rowland
 Holmes Herbert as Judge Rowland
 Constance Bennett as Edith
 Marie Burke as Mrs. Bascom
 Matilda Metevier as Louise
 Ernest Hilliard as Walter Stanley

References

Bibliography
 Munden, Kenneth White. The American Film Institute Catalog of Motion Pictures Produced in the United States, Part 1. University of California Press, 1997.

External links
 

1922 films
1922 drama films
American silent feature films
American mystery films
American black-and-white films
Films directed by George Archainbaud
Selznick Pictures films
1920s English-language films
1920s American films
Silent mystery films